is a Japanese manga series by Azu. It was serialized in Kodansha's seinen manga magazine Weekly Young Magazine from February 2016 to February 2021 and has been collected into eight tankōbon volumes. Kodansha USA published the series digitally in North America. An anime television series adaptation by Liden Films aired from July to September 2019.

Plot 
An unmotivated first-year high school boy finds a girl practicing a magic trick. The girl is Sempai, the only remaining member of the Magic Club. She has stage fright whenever she performs in front of an audience, which often results in her screwing up. She recruits the boy to be her assistant, despite his objections.

Characters

A high school girl who is a skilled magician when no one is watching. However, due to embarrassment and clumsiness, she easily gets stage fright and often blunders her magic tricks when even one person watches her perform. One of her weaknesses is that she is easy to hypnotize.

A high school boy who gets recruited to be Sempai's assistant in the Magic Club, despite his objections. It has been shown he can do magic tricks better than Sempai. He has short hair in a bowl cut. He also joins the school's Chemistry Club.

Sempai's older sister, who is a teacher at the school. She agrees to be the Magic Club advisor. She is a bit air-headed as well, and enjoys dressing Sempai in cosplay costumes. It is later revealed that she is married.

Saki is a third-year transfer student with long wavy hair. She is in charge of the Street Performance Club and intends to take over the Magic Club. She is obsessed with her little brother, Masashi. She can make balloon animals, but her performances are as clumsy and ditzy as Sempai's. After losing to Sempai in comparing breast sizes, she and Masashi join the Magic Club. She and Sempai are not good students academically.

Masashi is Saki's obese little brother. He is level-headed like Assistant. He and Saki join the Magic Club.

Madara is a second-year student and president of the Chemistry Club. She let Assistant join her club when the Magic Club did not have enough members. She has long dark hair and wears glasses. She is able to do some tricks by using science techniques but is annoyed by Sempai's antics.

Media

Manga
Magical Sempai, written and illustrated by Azu, was serialized in Kodansha's Weekly Young Magazine from February 29, 2016 to February 15, 2021.<ref></p></ref><ref></p></ref> Kodansha collected its chapters in eight individual tankōbon volumes, which were released from August 5, 2016 to March 5, 2021.

Kodansha USA published the series digitally in North America from September 12, 2017 to August 31, 2021.

A spinoff manga series titled  by Shotan was launched in Ichijinsha's Manga 4-Koma Palette on November 22, 2019.

Anime
An anime television series adaptation was announced in the 49th issue of Weekly Young Magazine on November 5, 2018. The series was produced by Liden Films and directed by Fumiaki Usui. Rintarou Ikeda handled the series composition, Eriko Itō designed the characters, and Takeshi Hama composed the music. 

It aired from July 2 to September 17, 2019 on Tokyo MX, MBS, and BS-NTV. The series consists of 12 fifteen-minute episodes. i☆Ris performed the opening theme "FANTASTIC ILLUSION", while Minori Suzuki performed the ending theme . Crunchyroll streamed the series.

On November 16, 2019, Crunchyroll announced that the series would receive an English dub.

Notes

References

External links
 
 

2019 anime television series debuts
Anime series based on manga
Comedy anime and manga
Crunchyroll anime
Kodansha manga
Liden Films
School life in anime and manga
Seinen manga
Tokyo MX original programming